Collegium Gostomianum is a secondary school in Sandomierz, Poland. Founded in 1602, it is one of the oldest schools in Poland.

History
The building was established in 1602 by Hieronim Gostomski, voivode of Poznań for the Jesuits. The construction started in 1604 according to design by a Jesuit Michał Hintz and was completed in 1615. At that time two wings were built at the edge of Vistula river and surrounding romanesque St. Peter's Parish Church. The eastern wing was intended to house Jesuit Collegium, named after the founder Gostomianum, and the southern wing housed a monastery.

See also 
 List of mannerist structures in Southern Poland
 List of Jesuit sites

References

External links
  [www.lo1.sandomierz.pl/ Official website]

1602 establishments in the Polish–Lithuanian Commonwealth
Schools in Poland
Sandomierz
Buildings and structures completed in 1615
Buildings and structures in Świętokrzyskie Voivodeship